The Delhi–Mumbai Expressway is a 1,350 km long, 8-lane wide (expandable to 12-lane) under-construction access-controlled expressway connecting India's national capital New Delhi with its financial capital Mumbai. Foundation stone of the project was laid by union minister Nitin Gadkari in presence of Sushma Swaraj & Arun Jaitley on 8 March 2019. The total project value including the land acquisition cost is around ₹1,00,000 crores (~US$13.1 billion). An additional 31 km long spur will also be constructed by the NHAI from Noida International Airport in Jewar to Sector-65,  Faridabad on this expressway (DND–KMP Expressway). 

Delhi–Mumbai Expressway will connect Sohna Elevated Corridor, Delhi to Jawaharlal Nehru Port in Maharashtra via Dausa, Kota, Ratlam, Vadodara and Surat. It passes through the Union territory of Delhi (12 km) and the states of Haryana (129 km), Rajasthan (373 km), Madhya Pradesh (244 km), Gujarat (426 km) and Maharashtra (171 km). The main length of the expressway is from Sohna to Virar only i.e. 1,198 km. Additionally, it has two spurs: DND–Faridabad–KMP (59 km) and Virar–JNPT (92 km), which increases its length to 1,350 km.

Initially, the expressway will be 8-lane wide with the greenfield-alignment route in backward areas, which will reduce the current 24 hours travel time to 12 hours. Land for an additional four lanes shall be reserved in the middle of the road for future expansion, along with the space for utilities, plantation and public transport on both sides. This expressway, along with Western Dedicated Freight Corridor (Western DFC) will be a vital backbone of the Delhi-Mumbai Industrial Corridor.

Route alignment 
At the Delhi end, the Delhi–Mumbai Expressway has two main entry/exit points: DND Flyway, Maharani Bagh in Delhi and Alipur village, north of Sohna in Haryana. Traffic coming from both ends and moving towards Vadodara/ Mumbai will merge at the double trumpet interchange with KMP Expressway in Khalilpur village (Nuh district) of Haryana. The greenfield alignment is as follows:

Section 1: DND–Faridabad–KMP

NCT of Delhi (12 km) 
 Begins in Delhi from the junction of DND Flyway and Ring Road at Maharani Bagh
 Pass through Khizrabad, Batla House and Shaheen Bagh on Yamuna river's west bank
 Starts moving exactly along the Agra Canal from Okhla Vihar metro station to Mithapur
 2nd entry ramp near Kalindi Kunj metro station (from Noida towards Mithapur)
 Exits Delhi near MCD Toll, Mithapur Chowk.

Haryana-I (47 km) 
 On Kalindi Kunj–Mithapur road, it will cross the Agra Canal at Sehatpur Bridge (Faridabad)
 Move on Faridabad bypass road from Sector-37, Faridabad to Kail Gaon, Ballabhgarh 
 Interchange with Delhi–Agra (NH-2) near DPS Ballabhgarh school at Kail Gaon village
 Crosses Palwal–Sohna (NH-919) at Hajipur village (Gurgaon district)
 Toll Plaza at Kiranj (Nuh district). It is 56 km from the DND starting point.
 Trumpet interchange with KMP Expressway at Khalilpur, (Nuh district).

Section 2: Sohna–KMP–Vadodara

Haryana-II (79 km) 

 Sohna–Gurgaon road: Begins at Alipur village (Gurgaon district)
 NH-919 (Sohna–Palwal) interchange at Sancholi village (Gurgaon).
 Toll Plaza is at Hilalpur village near Bhirawati (Nuh district)
 Trumpet interchange with KMP Expressway at Khalilpur village in Nuh district. Traffic coming from Maharani Bagh in Delhi by 59 km long DND–Faridabad–KMP section will also merge here.
 Naurangabad village (Palwal district).
 SH-132 (Nuh–Hodal) interchange, east of Ujina
 Khanpur Ghati village (west of Pinangwan) 
 Ferozepur Jhirka interchange at Ghata Shamasabad village (Nuh district). 
 Exits Haryana from Kolgaon village (Nuh district).

Rajasthan (373 km) 
 Enters Rajasthan at Munpur Karmala village (Alwar district)
 SH-45, Sirmaur village (Alwar district)
 SH-14 Alwar interchange at Seetal village, near Baroda Meo (Alwar district)
 SH-44, Chhila Chhoh village near Laxmangarh (Alwar district)
 NH-921 interchange at Pinan village (Alwar district) for Rajgarh and Mandawar
 Peechupara Khurd village near Bandikui
 NH-21 Dausa interchange at Bhandrej village (east of Dausa)
 NH-148, Lalsot interchange at Dungarpur village (Dausa district)
 NH-23 Lalsot interchange at Chimanpura (Dausa)
 East of Bonli (Sawai Madhopur district)
 NH-552 Sawai Madhopur interchange at Jaisapura (Sawai Madhopur)
 SH-29 interchange, east of Indragarh (Bundi)
 East of Lakheri (Bundi district)
 SH-70, Sultanpur village (Kota district)
 NH-27 Kota interchange at Karariya village (Kota)
 NH-52 Kota interchange at Mandana village 
 SH-9A Rawatbhata interchange at Chechat
 Exits Rajasthan at Moondiya village (Kota district)

Madhya Pradesh (244 km) 
 Enters Madhya Pradesh at Dhabla Madhosingh village (Mandsaur district)
 SH-31A Neemuch/ Jhalawar interchange, east of Bhanpura   
 Garoth interchange at south of Garoth (Mandsaur district)
 Crosses Chambal River near Amli village (Mandsaur)
 SH-14 Mandsaur interchange at Dalawada village (east of Sitamau)
 SH-17 Jaora interchange at Bhuteda village (Ratlam district)
 Namli interchange at Nayapura village (Ratlam district)
 NH-927A Ratlam/ Sailana interchange at Dhamnod village (north-west of Ratlam)
 SH-39 Thandla interchange at Manpur village (Jhabua)
 Crosses Anas river at Dhebar village (Jhabua)

Gujarat-I (149 km) 
 enters Gujarat at Chhayan village (Dahod district)
 NH-56 interchange, north of Dahod
 NH-47 interchange, north of Godhra
 NE-1 Ahmedabad interchange at Dodka village (Vadodara district)

Section 3: Vadodara–Virar

Gujarat-II (277 km) 
 NE-1 Ahmedabad interchange at Dodka village (Vadodara district)
 NH-48/ NH-64 Ahmedabad interchange at Fajalpur village (near Nandesari), north-west of Vadodara 
 Vadodara-Padra road interchange between Samiyala and Laxmipura village, west of Vadodara
 SH-6 Dahej interchange at Dehgam village, west of Bharuch
 NH-48 interchange at Moti Naroli village, east of Kim (Surat district)
 NH-53 Surat interchange at Ena village between Palsana and Bardoli
 east of Navsari
 east of Valsad

Maharashtra-I (79 km) 
 Gujarat-Maharashtra border
 Virar (Palghar district)

Section 4: Virar–JNPT

Maharashtra-II (92 km) 
 Virar (Palghar district)
 Amane (Thane district)
 Badlapur (Thane district)
 JNPT, (Raigad District)

Formation of SPV

The National Highways Authority of India (NHAI) has formed a Special purpose vehicle (SPV) to finance the construction and operation of the Delhi–Mumbai Expressway. The SPV has been registered on 29 August 2020 by the name of DME Development Limited (DMEDL) and it will be wholly owned by the NHAI. By floating SPV specific to a corridor, NHAI is aiming at diversifying its resource base to develop a sustainable and self-liquidating approach to raise finances. The toll on the projects housed in SPV shall be collected by NHAI and SPV shall get the annuity payments without any construction and tolling risks. On 1 March 2021, DME Development Limited received the highest 'AAA' credit ratings from CRISIL, Care Ratings and India Ratings.

Construction

Construction Phases 

The entire 1,350 km long Delhi–Mumbai Expressway has been divided into 4 sections with a total of 52 construction packages/tenders, where the length of each package is between 8 km to 46 km.

List of Contractors
The NHAI has awarded the construction work in 52 packages to around 20 construction companies. Around 15,000 hectares of land has been acquired for this project. The list of contractors is as follows:

Note: As of 11 November 2021, Tender for 65 km length is pending i.e. for 4 packages in Maharashtra (Virar–JNPT section).

Project financing

The project is being executed in 52 packages, out of which 31 are under Engineering, Procurement and Construction model or EPC projects (Sohna–Vadodara segment) while the remaining 21 are Hybrid Annuity Model or HAM projects. The HAM Model is a hybrid or mixture of EPC Model and BOT Model in which the Government of India will pay 40% of the project cost in trenches linked to milestones, while the balance 60% cost will be arranged by the contractors.

World record for construction

In Gujarat, contractor Patel Infrastructure created a world record by laying Pavement quality concrete (PQC) in 2.58 km length in 4-lane width (4x2.58 =10.32 lane km) within 24 hours. The work of laying PQC started on February 1, 2021 at 8 am and ended the next day at 8 am. An 18.75 metre wide German-made Wirtgen concrete paving machine was used in this stretch.

Special features
The various special features of the Delhi–Mumbai Expressway are as follows.

Wayside Amenities
The expressway will have Wayside Amenities at 93 places having facilities like ATM, hotels, retail shops, food courts, charging stations for electric vehicles and fuel stations. It will also be the first expressway in India to have helipads and fully equipped trauma centers at every 100 km for accident victims.

Electric Highway
On 25 March 2021, Union Minister Nitin Gadkari said in Lok Sabha that there is a plan to develop a stretch of this expressway as an e-Highway (electric highway) where trucks and buses can run at a speed of 120 km/hour which will bring down the logistics cost by 70% as heavy vehicles will run on electricity instead of diesel. National Highways Authority of India (NHAI) has started the construction of this project, and is expected to be completed by March 2022. It will also have 4 dedicated lanes for electric vehicles in the entire expressway, out of 8 lanes.

Environment friendly
It is being developed as an environment-friendly expressway with a tree cover of 20 lakh trees, watered with drip irrigation along the entire stretch with a rainwater harvesting system at every 500 metres. Expressway will be lit using a mix of power supply from state grids and Solar energy.

Wildlife crossings 

A combined length of 2.5 km of this 8-lane wide expressway will have run under 5 natural-looking wildlife crossings on the stretches identified as the known wildlife corridors between tiger reserves. One of these crossings will be a tunnel in Mukundara Hills National Park, which will be the country’s first 8-lane wide tunnel. This will be the first expressway in India to have wildlife crossings. The crossing over the expressway will have 8 meters tall noise barrier walls on either side, and the uncovered stretch of expressway passing through the wildlife corridor will have 6-foot tall walls on both sides of the expressway to prevent animals and pedestrians from entering to minimize the impact of traffic zipping past at speeds up to 120 km/hour. This expressway runs through Aravalli Wildlife corridors especially affecting corridors between four Tiger Reserves of Rajasthan, namely Sariska Tiger Reserve, Mukundara Hills National Park, Ranthambore National Park and Ramgarh Vishdhari Wildlife Sanctuary, all of which are important Tiger reserves of India. There is overcrowding at Ranthambore, and tigers have migrated to other sanctuaries and reserves via the Aravalli wildlife corridor, for example, at least 3 tigers have migrated out of Ranthambore to Ramgarh since 2013.

Wildlife experts have expressed concerns as there are not sufficient wildlife crossings on this very wide 8-lane expressway, especially between Sariska and Ranthambore reserves as well as Sariska reserve and leopard habitat forests of Delhi-Gurugram-Faridabad-Nuh in Delhi NCR. Area is also part of leopard corridor of NCR. Additional wildlife crossings are needed at several locations, such as on alignment near Faridabad (alignment near Nimot-Kot-Dhouj forested hills), hills east of Bhadas (hill from Devla Nagli to Rithat to Khanpur Ghat), Hills near Firozpur Jhirka (crossings near Kheri Kalan, Regarh, Bhakro Ji, Bas Burja), Naugaon, Dohli, near Alwar and Sariska (Ghata-Chirawanda-Kalakha), Nangal Todiyal, Bandikui, Dausa, Chhateda, etc.

Inter-connectivity

Delhi-Haryana-UP: The Delhi–Mumbai Expressway will be directly connected with various other expressways like Delhi–Noida Direct Flyway (DND Flyway) in Delhi, Western Peripheral Expressway (which will connect it to Delhi-Katra Expressway) in Haryana. It will also connect to Trans-Haryana Expressway via 86.5 km long 6-lane access-controlled greenfield Paniyala–Barodameo Expressway (Paniyala (South of Narnaul) to Mator, Alwar and Barodameo).

Rajasthan-MP-Maharashtra-Telangana: Kota-Indore Expressway (136 km) will connect it to Hyderabad–Indore Expressway (via Nanded-Akola-Omkareshwar-Indore), which will intersect Mumbai Nagpur Expressway at Akola.

Gujarat:
In Gujarat, a new spur named Vadodara-Ankleshwar Expressway is being created for better connectivity in Gujarat.
it will also connect to Ahmedabad–Vadodara Expressway and at Ahmedabad it will connect to Ahmedabad-Dholera Expressway.

Maharashtra: It will be connected with Mumbai–Nagpur Expressway (near Mumbai and Akola) and Mumbai–Pune Expressway (near Mumbai).

Side spur
The expressway will have multiple side spurs in the future, which will help commuters to connect with other major cities which are not directly connected on the main route. In July 2022, the NHAI awarded the construction work of a 31-km long addition side spur connecting Noida International Airport in Jewar with Sector-65, Faridabad bypass, Haryana on this expressway. Similarly NHAI awarded construction work of Bandikui-Jaipur spur package in March 2022.

Status updates
 Mar 2018: Contract awarded by the NHAI on 20 March for 24 km long Package-1 of Vadodara–Virar section in Gujarat to IRB Infrastructure.
 Aug 2018: Union Minister Nitin Gadkari said that the construction work of Delhi–Mumbai Expressway will start by December 2018.
 Dec 2018: Construction work started on Narmada River by Ashoka Buildcon on 10 December. It is part of Package-4 of Vadodara–Virar section.
 Jan 2019: Land acquisition work is at last stage in Haryana. Construction work started for Package-1 and 2 of Vadodara–Virar section, while work of Sohna–Vadodara section to start soon. 
 Mar 2019: Foundation stone laid by Union Minister Nitin Gadkari for DND–KMP section on 1 March 2019 and Sohna–Vadodara & Virar–JNPT sections on 8 March 2019. Construction work awarded for 148 km, 400 km of work to be awarded in a month and the rest 800 km of work to be awarded in the next 6 months. The ₹90,000 crores expressway will take about 3 years to complete.
 Sep 2019: Construction work of Sohna–Vadodara section started on 5 September for Package-3 and on 13 September for Package-1 & 2. All 3 packages are in Haryana (Sohna to Kolgaon).
 Feb 2020: While presenting the Union Budget of India (2020–21) in the Parliament, Finance Minister Nirmala Sitharaman said that this expressway will be ready by March 2023.
 Jun 2020: 497 km under construction, 162 km of work awarded, 569 km under the bidding process. Detailed Project Report (DPR) to be prepared for 92 km long Virar–JNPT (Virar–Mumbai) section.
 Aug 2020: Contracts awarded for all 3 packages of 59 km long DND–Faridabad–KMP section to DRA Infracon. It will pass through DND Flyway, Faridabad, Ballabhgarh and KMP Expressway.
 Oct 2020: Soil testing work started in Faridabad on DND–Faridabad–KMP section. Contracts awarded in Maharashtra for Package-11, 12 & 13 of Vadodara–Virar section on 15 October 2020.
 Apr 2021: 710 km under-construction. Work awarded by NHAI for 41 out of 52 construction packages (1,110 km out of 1,350 km).
 July 2021: 350 km has been constructed, 825 km is under-construction and Tenders for remaining 7 out of 52 packages to be awarded before March 2022: Nitin Gadkari said in Rajya Sabha.
 Aug 2021: A link road will be constructed which will connect Sector-65, Faridabad in Haryana on this expressway to the upcoming Noida International Airport in Jewar, Uttar Pradesh.
 Sep 2021: The construction work of the steel bridge over Narmada river near Bharuch in Gujarat has been completed in a record time of 32 months: Union Minister Nitin Gadkari.
Oct 2021: NHAI begins design work of the 30 km long side spur connecting Noida International Airport in Jewar, Uttar Pradesh with Ballabhgarh (Faridabad), Haryana on this expressway.
Feb 2022: During the Budget Session, President Ramnath Kovind said that the expressway will be completed soon.
 Mar 2022: Segment Launcher started erection of concrete structures in Delhi on 21 March. It is a part of DND–Faridabad–KMP section (Package-1) in which 7 km out of 9 km will be elevated.
 Mar 2022: GR Infraprojects Ltd emerges as the lowest bidder to construct and operate the 67 km long Bandikui–Jaipur spur section.
 July 2022: Tender for Faridabad bypass to Jewar Airport (Spur package) has been awarded by the NHAI to Apco Infratech Pvt. Ltd. on 29 July.
 Dec 2022: 1063 km under-construction out of 1386 km; 7 packages (202 km) out of 53 (1386 km) completed as of 30th December 2022. 
 Feb 2023: Prime Minister Narendra Modi inaugurated the 246-km long Sohna–Dausa–Lalsot stretch of the expressway on 12 February 2023. The entire Expressway is expected to be opened by January 2024.

See also 
 Expressways in India
 National Highways Development Project
 Delhi-Amritsar-Katra Expressway
 Delhi-Jaipur Expressway
 Eastern Peripheral Expressway
 Western Peripheral Expressway
 Yamuna Expressway
 Mumbai–Nagpur Expressway

References

National expressways in India
Proposed road infrastructure in India
Expressways in Haryana
Proposed infrastructure in Maharashtra
Transport in Delhi
Transport in Navi Mumbai